King's Wood is a 31.7 hectare Local Nature Reserve in Corby in Northamptonshire. It managed by the Wildlife Trust for Bedfordshire, Cambridgeshire and Northamptonshire.

More than 250 plant species have been recorded at this remnant of the Royal Forest of Rockingham, including ones characteristic of ancient woods including yellow archangel and wood anemone. There are diverse invertebrates such as green-veined white butterflies and common blue damselflies, and birds include treecreepers, long-tailed tits, green woodpeckers and tawny owls.

Access points include one at the junction of Danesholme Road and Gainsborough Road.

References

Wildlife Trust for Bedfordshire, Cambridgeshire and Northamptonshire reserves
Local Nature Reserves in Northamptonshire